Rich Than Famous is a mixtape by American rapper Rich the Kid. It was released on December 25, 2014. The mixtape features guest appearances from YG, Migos, Bobby Shmurda, Rowdy Rebel, Gucci Mane, Peewee Longway and Johny Cinco. The mixtape features production by Darkside Productions, Harry Fraud, K.E. on the Track, Deko, OG Parker, Jahlil Beats, Metro Boomin, Murda Beatz, Ralph Beats, Zaytoven and Spiffy.

Track listing

References

2014 mixtape albums
Rich the Kid albums
Albums produced by Zaytoven
Albums produced by Harry Fraud
Albums produced by Jahlil Beats
Albums produced by Metro Boomin
Albums produced by Murda Beatz